Port Jackson was an electoral district of the Legislative Assembly in the Australian state of New South Wales. It was created at the 1991 election, largely from the electorates of Balmain and McKell, and was abolished at the 2007 election being substantially replaced by the recreated electorates of Balmain and Sydney following a redistribution of electoral boundaries completed during 2004.

Members

Election results

References

Port Jackson
1991 establishments in Australia
Port Jackson
2007 disestablishments in Australia
Port Jackson